Maryse Andraos (born 1988) is a Canadian writer from Saint-Bruno-de-Montarville, Quebec, whose debut novel Sans refuge was shortlisted for the Governor General's Award for French-language fiction at the 2022 Governor General's Awards.

The daughter of an Egyptian father and a québécoise mother, she was educated at the Université du Québec à Montréal. The novel is an expansion of her earlier short story of the same name, which was the winner of Ici Radio-Canada's annual short story prize in 2018.

References

1988 births
Living people
21st-century Canadian novelists
21st-century Canadian short story writers
21st-century Canadian women writers
Canadian women novelists
Canadian novelists in French
Canadian women short story writers
Canadian short story writers in French
Canadian people of Egyptian descent
French Quebecers
People from Saint-Bruno-de-Montarville
Writers from Quebec